is a Japanese model, entertainer, and actress who is represented by Amuse, Inc.

Education
Rokusha graduated from Kyoto Municipal Hiyoshigaoka High School and Otemon Gakuin University Faculty of Letters Asian Culture Department.

Career 
She debuted as a model when she was fifteen years old. Rokusha worked as a model and entertainer in Osaka and in December 2005 she passed an audition for the Tokyo Broadcasting System drama Byōin e Ikou! and moved to Amuse on Tokyo.

She made regular appearances in the Kansai Telecasting Corporation series Sata Uma! Because of that, Rokusha did more work related to horse racing, including the Television Nishinippon Corporation series Dream Keiba, where she appeared as a quasi-regular guest with Rica Imai.

Filmography

Drama

TV series

Films

References

External links
 
 

Japanese female models
Japanese television personalities
1973 births
Living people
Actors from Kyoto Prefecture
20th-century Japanese actresses
21st-century Japanese actresses
Models from Kyoto Prefecture
Amuse Inc. talents
21st-century Japanese singers
21st-century Japanese male singers